Big Jake is a 1971 American Technicolor Western film starring John Wayne, Richard Boone and Maureen O'Hara. The picture was the final film for George Sherman in a directing career of more than 30 years. It grossed $7.5 million in the US, making it one of the biggest hits of that year. The supporting cast features Patrick Wayne, Christopher Mitchum, Glenn Corbett, Jim Davis, John Agar, Harry Carey Jr. and Hank Worden.

Plot 
In 1909, near the Mexico-United States border, Martha McCandles runs a massive ranch with the help of her sons Jeff, Michael, and James. The Fain Gang (The Fain Brothers, the Devries Brothers, John Goodfellow, Kid Duffy,  Breed O'Brien, Pop Dawson, and Trooper) attacks the ranch, brutally slaying many members of the staff. Jeff kills the Devries brothers, but is badly wounded; his son, Jacob "Little Jake" McCandles, is kidnapped before the gang flees to Mexico, leaving behind a ransom note for $1 million ($30.6 million today).

Martha places the ransom in a strongbox, and delegates from both the United States Army and the Texas Rangers offer to take the box for her. Martha decides instead to send for her estranged husband Jacob "Big Jake" McCandles, who wanders the west as a gunfighter with his black Rough Collie mix, simply named "Dog". Jake arrives and they confer in secret about what to do with the box.

Michael McCandles, the youngest son, arrives on a motorcycle with news he has found the kidnappers. Martha decides to allow him and his older brother James to set off with the Rangers in REO Runabouts to try to overtake the kidnappers. Jake disapproves, and sets off with the box, a mule, packhorses, and his elderly Apache friend Sam Sharpnose, preferring to do things the old fashioned way.

The kidnappers ambush the Rangers, killing three of them and putting the cars out of commission. Jake allows his two sons to accompany him. Relations are strained between Jake and James after the former's long absence from home, but Michael is delighted to see his father again and impresses him with his skill as a sharpshooter. However, Jake is put off by Michael's more modern and genteel ways.

John Fain, pretending to be only a messenger boy, intercepts the group and warns them bandits are now after the box. He tells them the gang will kill Little Jake if Big Jake (who pretends to be a hired hand during the encounter) doesn't do things exactly the gang's way.  He gives them further instructions on where the exchange will take place, in the town of Escondero.

On arrival, the family checks into a hotel and lays a trap for the bandits, killing them. During the attack, the strongbox is accidentally opened, revealing the money has been replaced by newspaper clippings. Both boys believe Jake has stolen the money, until Jake reminds them of the people that were killed by the Fain Gang, and that their brother Jeff has also been badly and possibly fatally wounded. He tells them that he and Martha, refusing to pay for that, took the money out.

Pop Dawson arrives with a message to meet the gang with the money in an old fort outside town. He tells them the rules - they are to ride together, and not try anything until after the gang has left with the money, because their own sharpshooter Duffy is hidden far away with a rifle trained on Little Jake at all times. Big Jake convinces Dawson that Michael was killed by the bandits, so he, James, Sam, and Dog follow Dawson to the fort.

Fain reveals he is the ringleader, and reiterates Dawson's threats.  Jake throws the key to Fain while Michael gets into position atop the fort with his rifle. Just as Fain opens the chest and realizes the deception, Big Jake opens fire and kills Fain's brother Will, who is holding Little Jake. Michael takes out Duffy, Sam kills Trooper, and James shoots down Dawson and O'Brien but breaks his hand.

Fain and Big Jake find themselves both wounded and in a stalemate from behind their respective hiding places, and Big Jake tells his grandson to run to James. Goodfellow slashes Sam and Dog with his machete, killing the Indian, and pursues Little Jake into a stable, where Dog attacks Goodfellow a second time and is killed. Big Jake, out of bullets, makes a run for it and kills Goodfellow with a pitchfork in the stables.

John Fain corners the weaponless grandfather and grandson outside the stable, but Michael, having come down from his perch, shoots Fain from behind. As Fain dies, Big Jake finally reveals his true identity to him, and to Little Jake, who has never met his grandfather before. Reunited at last, the family acknowledges their renewed bond and prepares to go home.

Cast

 John Wayne as Jacob McCandles
 Richard Boone as John Fain (Leader of Fain's Gang)
 Maureen O'Hara as Martha McCandles
 Patrick Wayne as James McCandles 
 Christopher Mitchum as Michael McCandles 
 Bruce Cabot as Sam Sharpnose 
 Bobby Vinton as Jeff McCandles 
 Glenn Corbett as O'Brien, aka Breed (John Fain's Gang) 
 John Doucette as Texas Ranger Capt. Buck Duggan 
 Jim Davis as Head of lynching party 
 John Agar as Bert Ryan 
 Harry Carey Jr. as Pop Dawson (John Fain's Gang)
 Gregg Palmer as John Goodfellow (John Fain's Gang)
 Jim Burk as Trooper (John Fain's Gang)
 Dean Smith as James William "Kid" Duffy (John Fain's Gang)
 Robert Warner as Will Fain (John Fain's Brother, John Fain's Gang)
 Jeff Wingfield as Billy Devries (John Fain's Gang)
 Everett Creach as Walt Devries (John Fain's Gang)
 Roy Jenson as Gunman at bathhouse in Escondero 
 Virginia Capers as Delilah 
 Hank Worden as Hank
 Ethan Wayne as Little Jake McCandles
 William Walker as Moses Brown
 George Fenneman as Narrator
 Tom Hennesy as Mr. Sweet
 Chuck Roberson as Texas Ranger

Production

Written as The Million Dollar Kidnapping, which was used as the shooting title, it was filmed from early October to early December 1970, in the Mexican states of Durango and Zacatecas, including scenes shot at the El Saltito waterfall and in the Sierra de Órganos National Park.

John Wayne's son, Patrick, portrays James McCandles. Robert Mitchum's son, Christopher, portrays Michael McCandles. Wayne's youngest son, Ethan, portrays Little Jake.

Reception
Howard Thompson of The New York Times encouraged theatergoers to "stick it out" until the exciting climax, to which the rest of the film was a "long prelude" that "simply jogs along fairly tediously on the rescue trail, with the star being his laconic self, plus conventional spurts of violence, likewise the saddle humor." Gene Siskel of the Chicago Tribune gave the film 2 stars out of 4 and wrote, "With a little bit of restraint, the latest John Wayne Western, 'Big Jake,' might have been one of the veteran star's recent best. The most obvious excess, and this is unusual for a John Wayne film, is violence." Arthur D. Murphy of Variety wrote that the film had "[a]n above-average script, plus excellent direction by vet George Marshall and superior photography by William Clothire on Mexican locations," but was "gratuitously violent far beyond the legitimate requirements of the action plot." Kevin Thomas of the Los Angeles Times stated, "To say that 'Big Jake' is a typical John Wayne western is pretty much to say it all. His fans should be well-satisfied with its tried and true combination of action and comedy. 'Big Jake' is scarcely distinguished but is certainly enjoyable." Gary Arnold of The Washington Post called it "a rather insufferable sort of 'typical' Wayne vehicle" with "an undercurrent of vindictiveness that spoils the ostensible humor. It's obvious that young actors are needed to appeal to younger viewers and to perform the kinds of physical action that require youth and dexterity and that Wayne is just too visibly massive and slow to accomplish these days—but they're treated almost exclusively as stooges ... There's no good reason why the young leads in a Wayne picture shouldn't be allowed to function with at least as much importance and dignity as Ricky Nelson in 'Rio Bravo' or the young actor who played opposite Joel McCrea and Randolph Scott in 'Ride the High Country' or, better yet, Montgomery Clift in 'Red River.'" Allen Eyles of The Monthly Film Bulletin declared, "Another genial celebration of Big John's ability to carry a film practically single-handed. Although supported by the group of dependables who usually appear in his films, as well as by a good proportion of his family, it is the Wayne personality—carefully catered for by the script—that accounts for most of the pleasure."

Home media
Big Jake was released to DVD by Paramount Home Entertainment on April 29, 2003, as a Region 1 widescreen DVD and on May 31, 2011, as a Region 1 widescreen Blu-ray DVD.

See also
 List of American films of 1971
 John Wayne filmography

References

External links
 
 
 
 
 
 

1971 films
1971 Western (genre) films
American Western (genre) films
1970s English-language films
Films directed by George Sherman
Batjac Productions films
Films scored by Elmer Bernstein
Films produced by John Wayne
Films set in 1909
Films set in Texas
Films set in Mexico
1970s American films
Cinema Center Films films